The Bumthang language; also called "Bhumtam", "Bumtang(kha)", "Bumtanp", "Bumthapkha", and "Kebumtamp") is an East Bodish language spoken by about 20,000 people in Bumthang and surrounding districts of Bhutan. Van Driem (1993) describes Bumthang as the dominant language of central Bhutan.

Related languages
Historically, Bumthang and its speakers have had close contact with speakers of the Kurtöp, Nupbi and Kheng languages, nearby East Bodish languages of central and eastern Bhutan, to the extent that they may be considered part of a wider collection of "Bumthang languages."

Bumthang language is largely lexically similar with Kheng (92%), Nyen (75%–77%), and Kurtöp (70%–73%); but less so with Dzongkha (47%–52%) and Tshangla (40%–50%, also called "Sharchop"). It is either closely related to or identical with the Tawang language of the Monpa people of Tawang in India and China.

Grammar
Bumthang is an ergative–absolutive language. The ergative case is not used on every transitive subject, but, like in so many other languages of the region shows some optionality, discussed in detail by Donohue & Donohue (2016).

See also
Languages of Bhutan
Bumthang District
Bumthang Province
Kingdom of Bumthang

References

Bibliography

 van Driem, George. 2015. Synoptic grammar of the Bumthang language. Himalayan Linguistics. Open access

External links 

Bumthang language project
Himalayan Languages Project

Languages of Bhutan
East Bodish languages
Languages written in Tibetan script